State Road 20 (NM 20) is a state highway in the US state of New Mexico. NM 20's southern terminus is at US 285 by Roswell, and the northern terminus is by Fort Sumner, at US 60 .

Major intersections

See also

References

020
Transportation in Chaves County, New Mexico
Transportation in De Baca County, New Mexico